Bappu may refer to:

People
 Salam Bappu, Indian film director
 Tirurangadi Bappu Musliyar, Indian scholar
 Vainu Bappu (1927–1982), Indian astronomer

Other
 2596 Vainu Bappu, minor planet
 Vainu Bappu Observatory, India
 Wilson–Bappu effect

See also